Agape chloropyga is a species of moth in the  family Erebidae. The species is found from Malaysia to eastern Australia, including Borneo and Papua New Guinea.

The wingspan is about 60 mm.

The larvae feed on the leaves of Moraceae species, including Ficus macrophylla and Ficus microcarpa.

External links
 Australian Insects
 The Moths of Borneo

Aganainae
Moths of Asia
Moths of Oceania
Moths described in 1854